Enver Nazymovych Ablaev (born 5 June 1977 in Chirchiq) is a Crimean Tatar freestyle skier of specializing in aerials who has represented Ukraine in the Olympics.

Career
Ablaev competed at the 2002, 2006 and 2010 Winter Olympics for Ukraine. In 2002, he finished 22nd in qualifying in the aerials event. In 2006, he placed 9th in the qualifying round, but finished last out of 12 qualifiers in the final. In 2010, he placed 19th in the qualifying round of the  event, again failing to advance to the final.

As of March 2013, his best showing at the World Championships is 4th, in 2003. Ablaev made his World Cup debut in August 2000. As of March 2013, he has one World Cup victory, in 2004/05 in Madonna di Campiglio. His best World Cup overall finish in aerials is 14th, in 2002/03, 2008/09 and 2010/11.

World Cup Podiums

References

1979 births
Living people
Olympic freestyle skiers of Ukraine
Freestyle skiers at the 2002 Winter Olympics
Freestyle skiers at the 2006 Winter Olympics
Freestyle skiers at the 2010 Winter Olympics
People from Chirchiq
Ukrainian male freestyle skiers
Crimean Tatar sportspeople
Ukrainian people of Crimean Tatar descent